San Fernando Valley is a 1944 American Western film directed by John English and starring Roy Rogers, Dale Evans and Jean Porter. The film was part of the long-running series of Roy Rogers films produced by Republic Pictures.

It was filmed at Deerwood Stock Farm (Kentucky Park Farms) and Hidden Valley in Thousand Oaks, California, with some car chase scenes filmed at nearby Iverson Ranch in the Simi Hills.

Plot
Rancher Cyclone Kenyon lives with his two granddaughters - Dale, a responsible adult who practically runs things; and Betty Lou, a boy-crazy bobbysoxer. Unfortunately, the ranch-hands would rather make music with Betty Lou than punch cattle, so Cyclone lets them go. Not that this improves things, because now there's the matter of replacing them. Dale does so—by hiring female ranch-hands. The women prove capable and lively, and all is well, notwithstanding Betty Lou who now has no one to flirt with—that is, until Roy and his sidekick Keno show up, begging for jobs. Cyclone hires them as cooks, which results in amateur-chef Roy giving everyone a case of Montezuma's Revenge. So that pretty much takes care of that. But soon Roy is in everyone's good stead, proving his worth as a two-fisted, cattle-ropin', ballad-singin' genius. Naturally, Betty Lou goes gaga, but it's Dale who falls in love.

A subplot is thrown in involving a foreman who skulks around the countryside, bilking people out of their money. At one point, he manages to steal every horse on Cyclone's ranch. But Trigger gallops to the rescue, hooves flying, trampling the thief. The stolen horses are retrieved and Cyclone agrees to hire back the male ranch-hands he fired, but only after pairing them off with one female ranch-hand each: otherwise, that oversexed vixen Betty Lou would never leave them alone.

Cast
 Roy Rogers as himself
 Trigger (horse) as himself 
 Dale Evans as Dale Kenyon 
 Jean Porter as Betty Lou Kenyon 
 Andrew Tombes as Cyclone Kenyon 
 Charles Smith as Oliver Griffith 
 Edward Gargan as Keno 
 Dot Farley as Hattie O'Toole 
 LeRoy Mason as Matt 
 Vernon and Draper as Dance Act 
 Morrell Trio as Skating Act 
 Bob Nolan as Bob 
 Sons of the Pioneers as Ranch Hands
 Doodles Weaver as Hot-Dog Vendor

References

Bibliography
 Hurst, Richard M. Republic Studios: Beyond Poverty Row and the Majors. Scarecrow Press, 2007.

External links

1944 films
1944 Western (genre) films
American Western (genre) films
American black-and-white films
Films directed by John English
Films set in the San Fernando Valley
Films shot in Ventura County, California
Republic Pictures films
1940s English-language films
1940s American films